Clay Dollars is a 1921 American silent drama film directed by George Archainbaud and starring Eugene O'Brien, Ruth Dwyer and Frank Currier. It was shot at studios in Fort Lee, New Jersey.

Cast
 Eugene O'Brien as Bruce Edwards
 Ruth Dwyer as June Gordon
 Frank Currier as Sam Willetts
 Arthur Housman as Ben Willetts
 Jim Tenbrooke as Lafe Gordon
 Florida Kingsley as Mrs. Gordon
 Tom Burke as Buck Jones
 Jerry Devine as Peter
 Bruce Reynolds as Village Cut-up

References

Bibliography
 Munden, Kenneth White. The American Film Institute Catalog of Motion Pictures Produced in the United States, Part 1. University of California Press, 1997.

External links
 

1921 films
1921 drama films
1920s English-language films
American silent feature films
Silent American drama films
Films directed by George Archainbaud
American black-and-white films
Selznick Pictures films
Films shot in Fort Lee, New Jersey
1920s American films